Bente Bergendorff (30 March 1929 – 25 February 1967) was a Danish sprinter. She competed in the women's 100 metres at the 1948 Summer Olympics.

References

External links
 

1929 births
1967 deaths
Athletes (track and field) at the 1948 Summer Olympics
Danish female sprinters
Olympic athletes of Denmark
Place of birth missing
Olympic female sprinters